Edenburg is a suburb of Johannesburg, South Africa. It is located in Region E. The name is a source of confusion, as the whole area is known not as Edenburg but as Rivonia. The road from Johannesburg to the south is named Rivonia Road. Edenburg has one large extension, and there are up to 25 small Extensions named 'Rivonia Extension ...' lying to the north. The name change took place many years ago, but was never made official in the Land Register.  
Edenburg took its name from the farm by that name.

References

External links
 COJ map services Online maps (GIS)

Johannesburg Region E